State Route 83 (SR 83) is a scenic state highway in southern Arizona, stretching from its junction with Interstate 10 near Vail south to Parker Canyon Lake.  It passes through sparsely populated areas of Pima, Cochise and Santa Cruz Counties, passing through the wine towns of Sonoita and Elgin.

Route description
The southern terminus of Route 83 is located at Parker Canyon Lake.  It heads northwest from the lake and passes through Sonoita before it reaches a junction with SR 82.  It continues to the north from this junction to its northern terminus at an interchange with I-10 near Vail, southeast of Tucson.

Junction list

References

External links

SR 83 at Arizona Roads

083
Transportation in Cochise County, Arizona
Transportation in Santa Cruz County, Arizona
Transportation in Pima County, Arizona